Kianga may refer to:

Kianga, New South Wales, Australia
Kianga, Queensland, a town in the Shire of Banana, Australia

See also
Kiang, a wild ass native to the Tibetan Plateau
Kiangai, a settlement in Kenya
Kiangan, Ifugao, Philippines